Australopachycormus is an extinct genus pachycormiform fish. It is only known from the type species, A. hurleyi, from the Early Cretaceous (Albian) Toolebuc Formation of Queensland, Australia. Like the related Protosphyraena, it possessed an elongated rostrum.

Etymology
The generic name derives from the Greek word 'Australo' (meaning 'southern') and 'pachycormus' (pachycormid generic name), referring to the fact that A. hurleyi is the first early Cretaceous pachycormid recorded from the southern hemisphere. The specific name honors Tom Hurley, who discovered the holotype specimen.

References 

Pachycormiformes
Prehistoric fish genera